"Flex" is a song co-written and performed by Jamaican dancehall recording artist Mad Cobra, issued as the first single from his eighth studio album Hard to Wet, Easy to Dry. It is his only song to date to appear on the Billboard Hot 100, peaking at number 13 on the chart in 1992. It also peaked at number one on the Billboard rap chart.

Composition
Mad Cobra stated that he was on a flight returning from New York, and was watching an exercise video on the in-flight entertainment system, and the lyrics "How this lady flex like she want to have sex?" came to him. He wrote the lyrics for the song on an air sickness bag in his plane seat and took them to the studio when he arrived in Jamaica. The song was meant to be an uptempo dancehall track in Mad Cobra's usual style, but became a slower R&B song when the backing tape accidentally slowed down and Mad Cobra slowed down his vocals to match the tape speed.

Music video

The official music video for "Flex" was directed by Scott Hamilton Kennedy.

Charts

Decade-end charts

References

External links
 
 

1992 singles
Columbia Records singles
Mad Cobra songs
Music videos directed by Scott Hamilton Kennedy
Song recordings produced by Sly Dunbar
Songs written by Mad Cobra